Medionidus walkeri is a species of freshwater mussel, an aquatic bivalve mollusk in the family Unionidae, the river mussels.

This species is endemic to the United States.

References

Molluscs of the United States
walkeri
Molluscs described in 1897
ESA threatened species
Taxonomy articles created by Polbot